The European Centre of Excellence for Countering Hybrid Threats (Hybrid CoE) is a network-based international and independent hub for practitioners and experts based in Helsinki, Finland. The Hybrid CoE focuses on responses to hybrid threats under the auspices of the European Union (EU) and NATO.

Function 
Hybrid CoE is described as a 'do tank' that conducts training courses, exercises, hosts workshops to policymakers and practitioners, and produces white papers on hybrid threats, such as vulnerabilities in an electrical grid or possible exploitation of vaguely written legislation. The Centre was formally established on 11 April 2017 under Finnish law with a memorandum of understanding between eight European states and the United States and in alignment with EU and NATO decisions. As of March 2022 it had 22 member states. The Centre was inaugurated on 3 October 2017 and allotted a budget of 1.5 million euros. It was first located in the Sörnäinen neighbourhood of Helsinki and was staffed by fifteen persons in 2018 with international expert networks to support them.

See also

 Centre Against Terrorism and Hybrid Threats
 European Union Intelligence and Situation Centre
 Finnish Institute of International Affairs
 Finnish Security Intelligence Service
 List of cyber warfare forces
 Machtpolitik
 Maskirovka

References

External links
 Official website
 Memorandum of Understanding on the European Centre of Excellence for Countering Hybrid Threats

Research institutes in Finland
2017 establishments in Finland
Organizations established in 2017
Think tanks established in 2017
Think tanks based in Finland
Foreign policy and strategy think tanks
Research institutes of international relations
Government of Finland
Bodies of the Common Security and Defence Policy
NATO relations